Alexander Zhyvotkov (born 1964 in Kyiv) is a Ukrainian artist who lives and works in Kyiv, the capital of Ukraine.
He studied at the Taras Shevchenko Republican Art School from 1975 to 1982. Zhyvotkov graduated from Kyiv State Art Institute (1982—1988, Kyiv, Ukraine). Since 1992 Alexander Zhyvotkov is a member of the art group Picturesque sanctuary; participant of the Ukrainian New Wave.

Biography 
Oleksandr Zhyvotkov was born on March 31, 1964, in Kyiv in a creative family that lived on the then Heroes of the Revolution Street (now - Tryokhsviatytelska), near St. Michael's Golden-Domed Monastery. He lives and works in his hometown - the Ukrainian capital. He began to receive the basics of art education before entering the Taras Shevchenko Republican Art School in 1975 (graduated in 1982) - in the family (he is a fifth-generation artist), where his father and older brother are artists, as well as in the environment. According to Alexander Zhyvotkov, his creative mentor and teacher was his uncle - artist Mikhail Rudakov (Moscow, Russia). He graduated in 1988 and received a diploma of higher education at the Faculty of Scenography of the Kyiv State Art Institute) during perestroika. His teacher was Oleksii Bobrovnikov.

Collections 
 Ministry of Culture of Ukraine
 Directorate of the National Union of Artists of Ukraine
 the National Museum 'Kyiv Picture Gallery' (former Museum of Russian Art)
 National Art Museum of Ukraine
 Sumy Art Museum (Ukraine)
 Khmelnitsky Art Museum (Ukraine)
 Ministry of Culture of Russia
 Kunsthistorisches Museum (Austria).

Alexander Zhyvotkov’s works are kept at museums and in numerous private collections in Europe, America, Asia and Africa. His paintings are sold at world auctions such as Sotheby's, Phillips.

Publications 
 Alexander Zhyvotkov. 'Live. Motherboard', Stedley Art Foundation, 2016.
 Alexander Zhyvotkov. 'Live. Дороги 2014—2015', Stedley Art Foundation, 2015.
 Alexander Zhyvotkov. 'Кyiv 2014', Stedley Art Foundation, 2015.
 Alexander Zhyvotkov. Canvas, wood, cardboard. Work with materials.1984—2014', Stedley Art Foundation, 2014.

References

External links 

 

1964 births
Living people
Ukrainian painters
Ukrainian male painters